The Young Men's Buddhist Association (YMBA) is a Buddhist cultural organization in Burma.

History

The YMBA was founded in Rangoon in 1906 as a federation of lay Buddhist groups dating back to 1898, with prominent founders including Ba Pe, Sir Maung Gyi and Dr. Ba Yin. It was modelled on the Young Men's Buddhist Association founded in Ceylon in 1898,<ref>Human Rights Watch (2009) [https://books.google.com/books?id=Np6j_KeQtjgC&dq=young+men%27s+buddhist+association+burma&pg=PA12 The Resistance of the Monks: Buddhism and Activism in Burma] p12</ref> and was created to preserve the Buddhist-based culture in Burma against the backdrop of British colonialism including the incorporation of Burma into India.

The YMBA started its first open campaign against British rule in 1916, and after many protests obtained a ruling that abbots could impose dress codes on all visitors to Buddhists monasteries.

The organization split in 1918 when older members insisted that it should remain apolitical, whilst younger members sought to enter the political sphere, sending a delegation to India to meet the Viceroy and Secretary of State to request the separation of Burma from India. Further lobbying delegations were sent to London in 1919 and 1920. Following its key involvement in the 1920 student strike, the most nationalist elements of the YMBA broke off and formed a political party known as the General Council of Burmese Associations, whilst a senior faction later formed the Independent Party. The YMBA is closely identified with the Myanmar military, and bestowed Military Chief Senior General Min Aung Hlaing with titles and the role of permanent patron. In February 2021 they were the first civil organization to issue a public statement supporting the Tatmadaw in their military coup.

Activities
The organization has founded multiple schools. It was one of the key organizations in the start of nationalist sentiment in Burma.

References

Further reading
Michale W. Charney. A History of Modern Burma''. New York: Cambridge University Press, 2009. p. 31.
Georgetown Berkeley Center article on this organization

1906 establishments in Burma
Buddhist organisations based in Myanmar
Youth organisations based in Myanmar
Men's religious organizations